Dominic Jack Spencer Vose (born 23 November 1993) is an English professional footballer who plays as an attacking midfielder for Gibraltar National League side Europa.

Vose has previously played in the Football League for Barnet, Colchester United, Scunthorpe United and Grimsby Town, having begun his professional career with Fulham and then West Ham United. He has played at Non-league level for Braintree Town, Tooting & Mitcham United, Welling United, Wrexham, Whitehawk, Bromley, Chester, Dulwich Hamlet, Kingstonian, Margate and Radcliffe, as well as a spell in Iceland with Magni Grenivík.

Career
Born in Lambeth, Vose came through the youth system at Fulham, and during his time there, had trials at Manchester United and Arsenal. He later joined West Ham United, making his debut for their reserves at the age of 16 before signing his first professional contract on his 17th birthday. He joined Braintree Town in the Conference Premier on loan for one month in October 2011.

Vose was released by West Ham in December 2012. Later that month, he signed for Tooting & Mitcham United, scoring one goal in four appearances. In January 2013, Vose went on trial with Stoke City, before signing a one-year deal at Barnet in February 2013. He made two appearances for Barnet in Football League Two; his debut as a 90th-minute substitute for Jon Nurse in a 2–0 win over Fleetwood Town on 19 March 2013, and his second when he came on as substitute on the final day of the season against Northampton Town. He left Barnet by mutual consent in August 2013.

On 1 November 2013, Vose signed for Colchester United on a monthly contract after impressing on trial with the club. He made his debut for the U's as a substitute for Craig Eastmond in the club's FA Cup first round defeat to Sheffield United on 9 November 2013. After making his first league appearance as a substitute for Ryan Dickson during a 1–1 draw with Preston North End on 23 November, Vose made his first start for Colchester on 26 November in a 3–1 win against Milton Keynes Dons three days later, before being substituted for eventual goalscorer Macauley Bonne on 68 minutes. In January 2014, Vose signed a contract with Colchester until the end of the season. He then extended his stay with the club by signing a two-year contract in May 2014. However, after making only a handful of appearances under new Colchester manager Tony Humes, Vose agreed to cancel his contract with the club by mutual consent on 2 December 2014 in order to seek first team football elsewhere.

Wrexham
In May 2015, he signed for National League club Wrexham on a one-year deal. He made his debut in the first game of the 2015–16 season for Wrexham in the 3–1 away defeat to Bromley.

Scunthorpe United
On 1 February 2016, Vose signed a -year contract with League One side Scunthorpe United for an undisclosed fee. Prior to him signing on transfer deadline day, a bid from rival National League side Grimsby Town was allegedly accepted, but apparently Vose wasn't willing to make the move, initially wanting to play out the season at Wrexham. However, later on, a statement by the Chief Executive at Wrexham denied Vose's claims that the Dragons had accepted a Mariners' bid: "We had an offer (from Grimsby) and they were being considered, but nothing had been accepted formally," adding that the decision to let him leave was purely for footballing reasons, earning a move to a club two divisions higher in the pyramid.

Vose made his debut for the club on 5 March 2016, coming on as a substitute on 85 minutes in the 0–0 draw at home to Gillingham. His only other appearance for the 2015–16 season was on 2 April 2016 in the 1–0 away defeat to Bradford City, coming off the bench in the 81st minute.

Vose continued to struggle to break into the first-team and signed a season-long loan with newly promoted League Two side Grimsby Town, which would keep him there until the end of the 2016–17 season. Scunthorpe released him at the end of the season.

Non-league
After being without a club for the start of the 2017–2018 season, Vose signed for National League South Whitehawk in October 2017. Following his departure from Whitehawk, Vose trained with Bromley and eventually signed for the club on 10 November, making his debut the following day and earning an injury time assist in a 1–0 win away to Guiseley. In February 2018 Vose joined Chester on a non-contract basis, being paid only expenses. He made 11 appearances, scoring one goal.

Vose spent the following two seasons with Dulwich Hamlet in the National League South. In September 2020, he signed for Isthmian League side Kingstonian. After only two appearances, Vose joined Margate on 2 November 2020. He left the club later that month without making an appearance. On 22 December, Radcliffe announced that they had signed Vose. On 22 January 2021, Vose signed for National League South side Welling United.

Europe
In 2021, Vose had a spell in Iceland with Magni Grenivík, before on 28 January 2022 signing for Europa of the Gibraltar National League.

Career statistics

References

External links

1993 births
Living people
Footballers from Lambeth
Black British sportspeople
English footballers
Association football midfielders
Isthmian League players
National League (English football) players
English Football League players
Fulham F.C. players
West Ham United F.C. players
Braintree Town F.C. players
Tooting & Mitcham United F.C. players
Barnet F.C. players
Colchester United F.C. players
Welling United F.C. players
Wrexham A.F.C. players
Scunthorpe United F.C. players
Grimsby Town F.C. players
Whitehawk F.C. players
Bromley F.C. players
Chester F.C. players
Dulwich Hamlet F.C. players
Kingstonian F.C. players
Margate F.C. players
Radcliffe F.C. players
Europa F.C. players